The list of provincial parks of the Lower Mainland contains the provincial parks located within this geographic region of the province of British Columbia. It includes parks from the two regional districts of Fraser Valley and Metro Vancouver. These parks are administered by BC Parks under the jurisdiction of the Ministry of Environment and Climate Change Strategy.

Parks

Fraser Valley Regional District

Metro Vancouver

References

External links 

Map of provincial parks in the Lower Mainland on env.gov.bc.ca

 
Provincial parks
British Columbia, Lower Mainland
Provincial parks